KD Singh Babu Stadium, formerly known as the Central Sports Stadium, is a multi-purpose stadium named after the famous hockey player K. D. Singh. The stadium was established in 1957 and it is located near the busy Hazratganj area of downtown Lucknow, in the heart of the city. it has a seating capacity of 25,000 and does not support floodlights for day night matches. The stadium is also the home ground for UP Cricket Team.

The stadium hosts domestic competitions regularly. Several International and national field hockey matches have been played here, now stadium is also used for domestic and few international cricket matches. The stadium is also sometimes used for association football games, like the District Football League matches of Lucknow. In 2012, the tournament was won by Sahara FC after defeating White Eagle Club. UP Police and Sunrise Club made it to the semi-finals that year, at the Dilkusha Grounds.

Facilities
K. D. Singh Babu Stadium is the main sports hub of Lucknow,  it has following facilities:
 Swimming complex
 Indoor games complex
 Synthetic tennis court

Records

Cricket
K.D. Singh Babu Stadium has hosted following international matches:
 in 1989, the MRF World Series (Nehru Cup) tournament, where Pakistan beat Sri Lanka by six runs. Imran Khan was the man of the match. This also happens to be the only ODI ever played on this ground. 
 in 1993/94 season, the first Test of Sri Lanka's tour of India where India won by an innings and 119 runs. This was also the last international match played by Men's national side on this ground. India won the toss and chose to bat. Nayan Mongia made his debut and Anil Kumble was the man of the match. Even though this was a 5-day test, 4th day of the test match (21 January 1994) was opted as a rest day and no play was held.
 in Women's cricket, the ground has hosted test teams from India, Australia, West Indies and New Zealand cricket teams. The first Women test started on 21 Nov 1976. The last test was played on 14 January 2002.
 in Women's cricket, the ground has hosted ODI teams from India, England, Australia, Netherlands and West Indies cricket teams. The first Women ODI was played on 5 December 1995. The last ODI was played on 1 December 2005.

Records and stats
In Women's cricket, England's opening batters Caroline Atkins and Arran Brindle (aka Arran Thompson) have broken the world record for an opening partnership for England by putting 150 on the board without loss at the end of the first day of the first Test against India in this stadium.

In Test cricket the highest score was made by India, scoring 511 all out followed by Sri Lanka 218 all out. The next highest score was also made by Sri Lanka scoring 174 all out. The most runs scored here was by Sachin Tendulkar (142 runs), followed by Navjot Sidhu (124 runs) and Roshan Mahanama (118 runs). The most wickets taken here was by Anil Kumble (11 wickets), followed by Muttiah Muralitharan (5 wickets) and Venkatapathy Raju (3 wickets).

The highest scores were made by Pakistan, scoring 219–6 in ODIs. The next highest scores were made by Sri Lanka who scored 213 all out. The most runs scored here was by Imran Khan (84 runs), followed by Aravinda de Silva (83 runs) and  Hashan Tillakaratne (71 runs). Wasim Akram, Abdul Qadir and Akram Reza have taken 2 wickets on this ground in ODIs.

See also
 BRSABV Ekana Cricket Stadium
 List of Test cricket grounds
 One-Test wonder

References

Test cricket grounds in India
Defunct cricket grounds in India
Cricket grounds in Uttar Pradesh
Sports venues in Lucknow
Sports venues completed in 1957
1957 establishments in Uttar Pradesh
20th-century architecture in India